Viriconium is an omnibus collection of two books of the Viriconium series by M. John Harrison.  It was published in 1988 by Allen & Unwin.  The book contains the novel, In Viriconium and the full contents of the short story collection Viriconium Nights.  Several of the stories first appeared in the magazines New Worlds and Interzone.

Contents
 Introduction, by Iain Banks
 In Viriconium
 "The Luck in the Head"
 "The Lamia and Lord Cromis"
 "Strange Great Sins"
 "Viriconium Knights"
 "The Dancer from the Dance"
 "The Lords of Misrule"
 "A Young Man’s Journey to Viriconium"

References

Fantasy short story collections
1988 short story collections